Below is a list of presidents of the British Computer Society from the inception of the BCS in 1957 onwards, with years of office.

 1957–1960 Prof. Sir Maurice V. Wilkes FRS FREng *
 1960–1961 Frank Yates CBE FRS *
 1961–1962 Dudley Hooper *
 1962–1963 Sid Michaelson *
 1963–1965 Sir Edward Playfair KCB *
 1965–1966 Sir Maurice Banks *
 1966–1967 Louis Mountbatten, 1st Earl Mountbatten of Burma *
 1967–1968 Stanley Gill *
 1968–1969 Basil de Ferranti *
 1969–1970 John Giffard, 3rd Earl of Halsbury *
 1970–1971 Alexander D'Agapeyeff OBE *
 1971–1972 Sandy Douglas CBE *
 1972–1973 Graham Morris
 1973–1974 Ray Barrington
 1974–1975 Ewart Willey
 1975–1976 Cecil Marks *
 1976–1977 Gerry Fisher
 1977–1978 Paul Samet
 1978–1979 Frank Sumner
 1979–1980 Julian Bogod
 1980–1981 Frank Hooper
 1981–1982 Peter Hall OBE *
 1982–1983 Prince Edward, HRH Duke of Kent
 1983–1984 David Firnberg
 1984–1985 Ewan Page
 1985–1986 Robert McLaughlin
 1986–1987 Sir John Fairclough *
 1987–1988 Ernest Morris TD
 1988–1989 Brian Oakley CBE *
 1989–1990 Dame Stephanie Shirley
 1990–1991 Alan Roussel
 1991–1992 Stephen Matheson CB
 1992–1993 Roger Johnson
 1993–1994 John Leighfield CBE
 1994–1995 David Mann
 1995–1996 Geoff Robinson CBE FREng
 1996–1997 Ron McQuaker *
 1997–1998 Sir Brian Jenkins GBE
 1998–1999 Ian Ritchie CBE FRSE FREng
 1999–2000 David Hartley
 2000–2001 Alastair Macdonald CB
 2001–2002 Geoff McMullen
 2002–2003 John Ivinson *
 2003–2004 Prof. Dame Wendy Hall
 2004–2005 David Morriss
 2005–2006 Charles E. Hughes
 2006–2007 Prof. Sir Nigel Shadbolt
 2007–2008 Rachel Burnett
 2008–2009 Alan Pollard
 2009–2011 Elizabeth Sparrow
 2011–2012 Prof. Jim Norton
 2012–2013 Bob Harvey
 2013–2014 Roger Marshall
 2014–2015 Prof. Liz Bacon
 2015–2016 Jos Creese
 2016–2017 Ray Long
 2017–2018 Paul Martynenko
 2018–2019 Chris Rees
 2019–2020 Michael Grant 
 2020–2021 Rebecca George OBE
 2021–2022 John Higgins CBE

* Starred entries above are deceased.

References

External links
 BCS past presidents

Lists of British people
British Computer Society
British Computer Society

Lists of members of learned societies